Gimp or GIMP may refer to:

Character
 Gimp (gaming), weak game character
 Gimp (sadomasochism), a sexual submissive dressed generally in a bondage suit

Embroidery and crafts
 Gimp (thread), an ornamental trim used in sewing and embroidery
 Gimp thread (scoubidou), plastic thread used in crafts such as lanyards

Arts and entertainment
 Gimp (album), by Psylons
 The GIMP Project, a New York dance company
 "The Gimp", a leather man in the film Pulp Fiction
 "The Gimp (Sometimes)", a song by British experimental band Coil off their 2004 album Black Antlers

Science and technology
 GIMP (GNU Image Manipulation Program), an open-source image editor
 Great Internet Mersenne Prime Search (GIMPS)

See also
 Gimp-Print, a collection of printer drivers
 Martin Snyder (1893–1981), Jewish-American gangster commonly known as Moe the Gimp